At 14:11 PST (06:11 UTC) on December 15, 2019, the province of Davao del Sur on the island of Mindanao in the Philippines was struck by an earthquake measuring 6.8 . It had a maximum perceived intensity of VII (Very strong) on the Modified Mercalli Intensity Scale. At least 13 people were killed and another 210 injured.

Tectonic setting 
Mindanao lies across the complex convergent boundary between the Sunda Plate and the Philippine Sea Plate. Part of the oblique convergence between these plates is taken up by subduction along the Cotabato Trench. The strike-slip component of the convergence is accommodated partly by the Philippine Fault System and partly by the Cotabato Fault System, a network of mainly NW-SE trending sinistral (left-lateral) strike-slip faults that form the boundary between the Cotabato Arc and the Central Mindanao Volcanic Belt. In the area of the December 2019 earthquake, the individual faults include the NW-SE trending Makilala–Malungon Fault, Tangbulan Fault and the Central Digos Fault.

Earthquake
The earthquake was recorded as 6.8  by ANSS and 6.9  by PHIVOLCS. The maximum felt intensity was assigned as VII MMI on the ANSS ShakeMap and VII PEIS in the PHIVOLCS summary for this event. The focal mechanism indicates strike-slip faulting with either sinistral movement on a NW-SE trending fault or dextral movement on a SW-NE trending fault, but the distribution of the aftershocks are consistent with the sinistral fault plane. The earthquake may be the result of movement on the Tangbulan Fault, according to PHIVOLCS.

There were a series of large aftershocks, including nine of M ≥ 5.0 in the first 48 hours after the mainshock, with the largest being an  5.7 event about an hour afterwards, which had a maximum felt intensity of VII (MMI).

This event followed on from a series of earthquakes that struck Mindanao during October that year. The sequence of three M>6 events affected that area to the northwest of the December earthquake. The December 15 event is likely to be related to the earlier sequence, possibly by the effects of stress transfer.

Damage and casualties

The greatest damage from the earthquake was in the area around the epicenter, in the towns of Matanao, Magsaysay, Hagonoy and Padada. Significant damage was reported in 207 out of 232 barangays in Davao del Sur, five in Sarangani, three in Sultan Kudarat and North Cotabato, respectively. This earthquake added to the damage that much of the affected area suffered during the Cotabato earthquakes in October. At least one road was declared impassable in the Matanao area, a hospital was destroyed in Hagonoy and there was significant damage to a police station and fire station in Padada. A total of 5,973 houses were destroyed in Davao del Sur, with 31,832 suffering some damage and a further 32 in North Cotabato. Three hundred and ninety-seven schools and 62 health facilities were damaged in Davao del Sur, Sarangani and North Cotabato.

A six-year-old child was crushed by a wall in the barangay of Asinan in Matanao. Three others were killed and several others were trapped in Padada when a supermarket collapsed. As of December 23, at least 13 people had been killed, one remained missing and a total of 210 people were reported injured in the quake.

Aftermath
As of December 29, 40,424 people from 10,505 families were reported to be sheltering in a total of 102 evacuation centers after the earthquake, with a further 100,427 people (23,321 families) being assisted by friends and family.

See also
List of earthquakes in 2019
List of earthquakes in the Philippines
2019 Cotabato earthquakes
July 2019 Makilala earthquake

References

External links
 
 

2019 earthquakes
December 2019 events in the Philippines
Earthquakes in the Philippines
2019 disasters in the Philippines